Sri Dev Suman Uttarakhand University (SDSUV) is a State university situated at Badshahithaul in Tehri Garhwal district of north Indian state of Uttarakhand, India.
It was established by the Government of Uttarakhand through Pt. Deen Dayal Upadhyay Uttarakhand Vishwavidhyalaya Act, 2011 and its amendment through Pt. Deen Dayal Upadhyay Uttarakhand Vishwavidhyalaya (Amendment) Ordinance, 2012 which changed the name of the institute.

References

External links
 

Universities in Uttarakhand
Tehri Garhwal district
Educational institutions established in 2012
2012 establishments in Uttarakhand